Foote is an English surname. Notable people with the surname include:

Adam Foote (born 1971), Canadian ice hockey player
Albert E. Foote (1846–1895) American mineralogist 
Alexander Foote (1905-1956) British born Soviet agent
Andrew Hull Foote (1806–1863), American naval officer, a Union admiral
Arthur Foote (1853–1937), American composer
Arthur De Wint Foote (1849–1933), American engineer
Barry Foote (born 1952), American baseball player
Callan Foote (born 1998), Canadian ice hockey player
Christopher Spencer Foote (1935–2005), American chemist 
Diane Foote (born 1954), New Zealand Olympic gymnast. 
Edward Bliss Foote (1829–1906) American physicist
Elisha Foote (1809–1883), American judge, inventor, and mathematician
Elizabeth Erny Foote (born 1953), Judge of the United States District Court for the Western District of Louisiana since 2010
Eunice Newton Foote (1819–1888), American scientist, inventor and feminist
Francis Onslow Barrington Foote (1850–1911), British army officer and musician
George William Foote (1850–1915), British founder of the secularist journal The Freethinker
Georgia May Foote (born 1991), English actress and model
Henry Bowreman Foote (1904–1993), British recipient of the Victoria Cross, Director of Royal Armoured Corps
Henry S. Foote (1804–1880), US Senator and Governor of Mississippi (1852–1854)
Hezekiah William Foote (1813–1899), American Confederate veteran, attorney, planter and state politician from Mississippi
Huger Lee Foote (1854–1915), American planter and state senator from Mississippi
Horton Foote (1916–2009), American author and playwright
Jeff Foote (born 1987), American professional basketball player
John J. Foote (1816–1905), New York politician
 Reverend John Weir Foote (1904–1988), Canadian recipient of the Victoria Cross during the Second World War
 Judy Foote (born 1952), Canadian politician and 14th Lieutenant Governor of Newfoundland and Labrador
Kenneth Foote (born 1948), American engineer
Larry Foote (born 1980), American football player
L.B. Foote (1873–1957) Canadian photographer
Lucinda Foote (1770/71–?), American teen who attempted to enroll at Yale College, but was rejected for her gender
Mary Foote (1872–1968), American painter; Carl Jung associate
Mary Hallock Foote (1847–1938), American writer and illustrator
Nathaniel Foote (1592–1644), founder of Wethersfield, Connecticut
Percy Wright Foote (1879–1961), American naval officer
Richard H. Foote (1918–2002), American entomologist
Robert Bruce Foote (1834–1912), British geologist who is considered the "Father of Indian Prehistory"
Samuel Foote (1720–1777), Cornish dramatist and actor
Selina Foote, (born 1985), New Zealand visual artist
Shelby Foote (1916–2005), American historian
Thomas Foote (1598–1687), English grocer and baronet
Thomas M. Foote (1808–1858), American diplomat
William Henry Foote (1794–1869), American Presbyterian minister in the Antebellum South

English-language surnames